Deauville-Clairefontaine Racecourse is a horse race track located in Tourgéville near Deauville in the Calvados département in the Normandy région of France. The  facility hosts harness racing, thoroughbred flat racing, steeplechase and hurdle races.

The countryside around Deauville is the main horse breeding region in France and home to numerous stud farms.

See also 

 Deauville-La Touques Racecourse

External links

 Official website for the Deauville-Clairefontaine Racecourse (in English).

Horse racing venues in France
Sports venues in Calvados (department)
Tourist attractions in Normandy